The Secretary of State for Science, Innovation and Technology, is a Secretary of State in the Government of the United Kingdom, with responsibility for the Department for Science, Innovation and Technology. The incumbent is a member of the Cabinet of the United Kingdom.

The incumbent Secretary of State is Michelle Donelan, who is the first holder of the office.

History 
The office was created by a government reshuffle on 7 February 2023, following a machinery government change, which combined responsibilities from the Department for Business, Energy and Industrial Strategy (BEIS) with responsibilities from the Department for Digital, Culture, Media and Sport (DCMS) and from the Government Office for Science. The Department and Secretary of State have responsibilities to "deliver improved public services, create new and better-paid jobs and grow the economy."

List

References 

2023 establishments in the United Kingdom
Lists of government ministers of the United Kingdom
Ministerial offices in the United Kingdom
Science and technology in the United Kingdom